Gossea may refer to:
 Gossea (hydrozoan), a genus of hydrozoans in the family Olindiidae
 Gossea, a genus of amphipods in the family Calliopiidae, synonym of Apherusa
 Gossea, a genus of worms in the family Neogosseidae, synonym of Neogossea